Timur Muratuly Suleimenov (Timur Mūratūly Süleimenov; 5 April 1978) is a Kazakh politician who served as Minister of National Economy from 28 December 2016 to 25 February 2019.

Biography

Early life and education 
Born in the Kazakh SSR, In 2000, Suleimenov graduated from Pavlodar State University with a degree in management. After that, having entered the Bolashaq scholarship at the Robert H. Smith School of Business in the University of Maryland, he earned degree there in 2002 in economics.

Career 
Suleimenov started his professional career at Ernst & Young Kazakhstan. After that, he was the director of the Tax Accounting and Tax Planning Department at the KazMunayGas Exploration Production company.

In March 2009, he was appointed as Vice Minister of Economy and Budget Planning, and in 2010, as the Vice Minister of Economic Development and Trade. On 1 February 2012, he became a member of the Board, Minister for Economy and Financial Policy of the Eurasian Economic Commission.

On 28 December 2016, by the Decree of the President of Kazakhstan, Suleimenov was appointed as Minister of National Economy. After being relieved from his post on 25 February 2019, he then became the deputy chairman of National Bank of Kazakhstan on 2 March 2019.

On 22 March 2019, Suleimenov was appointed as assistant to the President of Kazakhstan. Where he worked until becoming the deputy head of the Presidential Administration of Kazakhstan on 22 July 2019. From 6 February 2020, he headed the Center for Analysis and Monitoring of Socio-Economic Reforms under the Presidential Administration.

References 

1978 births
Living people
University of Maryland, College Park alumni
Government ministers of Kazakhstan